Lake Macbride State Park is a  state park in Johnson County, Iowa, United States, located near the city of Solon. The park is composed of two units centered on the  Lake Macbride. Both the park and the lake are named for Iowa conservationist Thomas Huston Macbride.

Lake Macbride is a popular fishing site; the rare spotted bass can be found in the lake, and it is also home to muskellunge, walleye, and channel catfish. The park provides an accessible fishing dock, twelve jetties, and a 24-hour fishing area for fishers along with seven boat ramps and a boat rental facility. The latter also houses a concession stand and is near the park's beach. The park also features  of hiking and multi-use trails, which travel through forests and restored prairie; one trail connects the park with Solon, while another links the beach and Lake Macbride's dam. Other facilities at the park include a modern campground with electric campsites, a primitive campground, and a day use lodge.

References

State parks of Iowa
Protected areas of Johnson County, Iowa